Shodh is a 1979 Bollywood ghost movie directed by Biplab Roy Chowdhury and produced by Sitakant Misra, based on the Bengali book Gorom Bhat O Nichhok Bhooter Goppo (Steaming Rice and a Ghost Story) by Sunil Gangopadhyay.

Plot
Surendra (Om Puri), having been exiled from his village in youth and established himself in the city, comes back to the news of his father's demise, reportedly at the hands of a phantom. He announces a prize for anyone who succeeds in showing him a ghost, which attracts the greed of the poor hungry peasants, resulting in the accusations of innocent people as haunted, and even murders with the hope of producing a ghost.

Cast
Om Puri - Surendra

Awards
 1980 - National Film Award for Best Feature Film
 1980 - National Film Award for Best Cinematography - Rajan Kinagi

References

External links
 

1979 films
Indian ghost films
1970s Hindi-language films
Films based on Indian novels
Best Feature Film National Film Award winners
Films whose cinematographer won the Best Cinematography National Film Award